Telesphere is a nationwide Unified Communications as a Service provider for businesses. In 2003 Telesphere began providing highly secure cloud-based voice and data services over a private IP MPLS network to mid and large enterprises throughout the United States and now also in Europe. Telesphere provides hosted VoIP, managed video bridging, MPLS network services, private SIP trunking, mobile integration and many other cloud communications services.  Services are available regardless of the geographic location throughout the United States.

History
Telesphere was founded in 2000 and is backed and operated by investors who were affiliated with Cellular One/AT&T Wireless, Nextel, Nextlink, XO Communications, and Clearwire, drawing talent from telecom industry veterans with successful track records.

In September 2009, Telesphere acquired the VoIP services business of Denver-based IP services provider Unity Business Networks.

From mid-2008 through mid-2010, Telesphere raised more capital than any other venture backed privately held company in Arizona. Funding has featured several premier telecommunications investors including: Rally Capital, Hawkeye Investments and the Greenspun Corporation. Telesphere agreed to be acquired by Vonage for $114 million in November  2014.

Current customers and sponsors
Telesphere currently supports customers across the US, Canada, and Europe.

Telesphere is active with national charities, including the American Red Cross, Make-a-Wish Foundation, Southwest Human Development’s Adapt Shop, and the American Lung Association. Community involvement is multi-faceted, taking place at all levels of the organization.  Telesphere actively participates in a Lunch Buddy Mentoring Program with Big Brothers Big Sisters; Making Strides; American Society Run/Walk; Make-a-Wish 5k Run; and, numerous other philanthropic events across the nation.

Awards
 Telesphere Ranked No. 1 UCaaS Provider by Wainhouse Research’s ‘BroadSoft Provider Power Rankings–2014 
 Telesphere Honored as One of the State’s Top 50 Largest Private Companies at Arizona Corporate Excellence Awards Night 
 Telesphere Recognized as a Challenger in Unified Communications as a Service (UCaaS) in 2014 Gartner Magic Quadrant 
 Telesphere Recognized as Inc. 500/5000 Fast-Growing Company 
 Telesphere selected as one of the Top Companies to Work for in Arizona 
 Telesphere Receives 2014 Unified Communications Product of the Year Award 
 TMC's Internet Telephony Magazine - 2013 Unified Communications Award 
 Deloitte - Technology Fast 500 Award 
 Inc 500/5000 - Inc 5000 Fastest Growing companies in the US (3rd year in a row) 
 Scottsdale Chamber of Commerce - 2013 Sterling Award Winner 
 BestCompaniesAZ.com 2014 Arizona's Most Admired Companies Winner

Cloud Communications Alliance
Telesphere is one of 23 technology companies that make up the Cloud Communications Alliance.

Clark Peterson, CEO of Telesphere, is the first and current chairman of the Cloud Communications Alliance.

References

Internet service providers of the United States
VoIP companies of the United States
Vonage
Companies established in 2000